John Faber may refer to:

Jack Faber (1903–1994), professor, lacrosse coach, and football coach at the University of Maryland
Johann Faber (1478–1541), German theologian
Giovanni Faber (1574–1629), German papal doctor, botanist and art collector sometimes called Johann Faber
John Faber the Elder (c. 1660–1721), Dutch portrait miniaturist and engraver active in London
John Faber the Younger (c. 1695–1756), Dutch portrait engraver active in London, son of the former
John Faber (Kansas politician), member of the Kansas House of Representatives
John Eberhard Faber (1822–1879), German-born American manufacturer of pencils